John Dalgreen (birth registered third ¼ 1955) is an English former professional rugby league footballer who played in the 1970s and 1980s.

Background
John Dalgreen's birth was registered in Spen Valley district, West Riding of Yorkshire, England.

Playing career

International honours
John Dalgreen won his only cap for Great Britain while at Fulham RLFC in the 1982 Ashes series against Australia. During the first half of the game at Wigan's Central Park, Dalgreen was tackled by fiery Kangaroos forward Les Boyd. While on the ground he lashed out with his boot at Boyd, kicking him in the shins. Boyd retaliated by kicking the Lions  and was sent off by the French referee Julian Rascagneres. Dalgreen escaped sanction for the incident as the focus was put on Boyd's send-off.

Player's No.6 Trophy Final appearances
John Dalgreen played  in Warrington's 9-4 victory over Widnes in the 1977–78 Players No.6 Trophy Final during the 1977–78 season at Knowsley Road, St. Helens on Saturday 28 January 1978.

References

External links
!Great Britain Statistics at englandrl.co.uk (statistics currently missing due to not having appeared for both Great Britain, and England)
Shaw Cross Sharks → Hall of Fame
(archived by web.archive.org) Statistics at wolvesplayers.thisiswarrington.co.uk

1955 births
Living people
English rugby league players
Great Britain national rugby league team players
Halifax R.L.F.C. players
London Broncos players
Rugby league hookers
Rugby league players from Batley
Warrington Wolves players
Yorkshire rugby league team players